Caroline Dhavernas (born May 15, 1978) is a Canadian actress. She is best known in the United States for her collaborations with Bryan Fuller. She played Jaye Tyler in the Fox comedy-drama series Wonderfalls, and Alana Bloom in the NBC psychological horror drama series Hannibal. 

She also starred as Lily Brenner in the ABC medical drama Off the Map. From 2017 to 2019, she portrayed the titular character in the Canada-produced and Canadian- and American-distributed medical drama-black comedy Mary Kills People.

Early life
Dhavernas was born in Montreal, Quebec, the daughter of the Québécois actors Sébastien Dhavernas and Michèle Deslauriers. Her sister Gabrielle Dhavernas is also an actress and specializes in dubbing. The voice timbre of both actresses is very similar, enabling Gabrielle to dub the voice of Caroline. She learned English at a very young age, as her parents sent her to an English-speaking elementary school called The Priory School.

Career

She began her career at the age of 8, dubbing voices for television productions such as Babar. At the age of 12 she began her acting career in the film Comme un Voleur (1990). Also in 1990, she played bubbly magic wizard fairy Lucy in the children's musical film via home video, The Magic Dragon Tales. In 1992, she appeared as the dark brunette haired girl who played with the horse in the bedtime story hit Black Beauty. In 1996, she played her main role as magical blonde mermaid princess Summer Rose in the girly romance drama Summer's Colors.

Dhavernas portrayed swimmer Marilyn Bell in the television film Heart: The Marilyn Bell Story (1999). She trained for two months with the Pointe-Claire Swim Club to convincingly portray Bell, who was the first to cross 32-mile Lake Ontario in 1954. Other notable films have included a leading role in Edge of Madness (2002), and supporting roles in Out Cold (2001) and Lost and Delirious (2001). She also had a notable role on Law & Order as a closeted, gay teenager who killed her girlfriend in the episode "Girl Most Likely" (season 12, episode 17).

Dhavernas portrayed Jaye Tyler, the central character in Wonderfalls, which debuted on US television in March 2004. Jaye is an over-educated underachiever from a wealthy family who lives in a trailer park and works at the Wonderfalls Gift Emporium, a Niagara Falls gift shop. The show's premise is that Jaye is spoken to by inanimate objects, which encourage her to help others. Dhavernas has described the show as being like "Touched by an Angel on acid". The show received widespread critical praise, but Fox cancelled the show after only four episodes aired. Millions of fans signed an online petition with the hope that Fox would continue the show, and as a result 20th Century Fox released the DVD with all 13 completed episodes. She did her own voice-overs for the French translation of Wonderfalls. She appeared as Cerise in the 2003 horror flick A Tale of Two Sisters, inspired the South Korea hit from 2001, whom she and Katharine Isabelle starred together.

Since the cancellation of Wonderfalls, Dhavernas has continued to appear in Canadian-made features in 2004, such as Niagara Motel and These Girls. In early 2006, she played Isabella Marie, who lived in love, tragedy, and ugliness with suggesting her family, winding up being pregnant, and haunting her dark vengeance with luciferin of fallen agony, in The Beautiful Beast and the follow-up The Diary Of Isabella. She also appeared in Black Sheep (2006 New Zealand film), produced by Jonathan King and directed by Eli Roth, as Nikki, Hollywoodland (2006) as Barbara about the death of actor George Reeves, and Juliana O'Neill, the wife of Eric O'Neill, on Breach (2007).

Dhavernas also took the lead role in Surviving My Mother (which went under the working title of The Yellow Woman), a film directed by Émile Gaudreault which premiered at the Festival des films du monde of Montreal on August 28, 2007. In 2008, Dhavernas starred in Passchendaele, a film written and directed by Paul Gross about the Battle of Passchendaele. Passchendaele accounted for half of 2008's box office revenue from made-in-Canada anglophone films and as of 2009 is the most expensive film in Canadian history.
It's a beautiful film and I'm really, really happy to be part of it. It's about battle of Passchendaele, which was a very important battle for Canadians and it's a big part of our history. It was just so amazing to be privileged to live a little part of that history. A piece of our history.

Other projects include The Cry of the Owl, a film adaptation of Patricia Highsmith's novel of the same name, and the popular Quebec comedy Father and Guns (De père en flic). In 2009, she played Bethany in the romance action drama In Heat. She also appeared in the first and last episodes of HBO's miniseries The Pacific, produced by Steven Spielberg and Tom Hanks, and a guest role on Law & Order: Criminal Intent, where she played Maya in the episode "Love Sick" in May 2010. In 2011, she played Emily in the rare appearance in the HS reading hit The Awakening.

In 2012, audiences saw her in Martin Villeneuve's Mars et Avril, a science fiction film based on the graphic novels of the same name.

In 2013, she was cast as Alana Bloom, the female lead in Hannibal, reuniting her with Wonderfalls creator Bryan Fuller.

Dhavernas starred in the Canadian black comedy-drama medical thriller Mary Kills People, which premiered on Global on January 25, 2017. The series premiered in the U.S. on April 23 on the Lifetime U.S. basic cable network. Season 2 debuted on Global on January 3, 2018, and also on Lifetime on March 13. Each season consisted of six episodes on both Global and Lifetime. Lifetime did not air the third and final season when the network announced in December 2018. The series concluded in 2019.

She also voiced the narrator in the video game from Ubisoft titled Child of Light.

In November 2021, CDPQ Infra announced that Dhavernas was selected to become the official voice announcer of the Réseau express métropolitain, following in the footsteps of her mother, Michèle Deslauriers, who has been the voice of the Montreal Metro since 2003.

Personal life
Dhavernas has been in a relationship with actor Maxime Le Flaguais since 2016. In September 2018 she gave birth to their daughter, named Françoise.

Filmography

Film

Television

Video game

References

External links

 

1978 births
Canadian child actresses
Canadian expatriate actresses in the United States
Canadian film actresses
Canadian television actresses
French Quebecers
Living people
Actresses from Montreal
20th-century Canadian actresses
21st-century Canadian actresses